Brazil will compete at the 2017 World Championships in Athletics in London, United Kingdom, from 4–13 August 2017.

Medalists

Results

Men
Track and road events

Field events

Combined events – Decathlon

Women
Track and road events

Field events

Combined events – Heptathlon

Athletes who achieved standards, but not selected
 Adriana Aparecida da Silva - Women's marathon (outside the Top-40 Olympic Ranking)
 Andreia Aparecida Hessel - Women's marathon (outside the Top-40 Olympic Ranking)
 Thiago Braz da Silva - Men's pole vault (injured)
 Geisa Coutinho - Women's 400 metres (outside the Top-40 Olympic Ranking)
 Paulo Roberto Paula - Men's marathon (outside the Top-40 Olympic Ranking)
 Jonathan Rieckmann - Men's 50 kilometres walk (injured)
 Valdilene dos Santos Silva - Women's marathon (outside the Top-40 Olympic Ranking)
 Mirela Saturnino de Andrade - Women's marathon (outside the Top-40 Olympic Ranking)
 Núbia Soares - Women's triple jump (injured)
 Moacir Zimmermann - Men's 20 kilometres walk (outside the Top-40 Olympic Ranking)

References

Nations at the 2017 World Championships in Athletics
World Championships in Athletics
2017